Elections for the Local Government Council were held in Nauru in late 1963. All nine incumbent councillors were re-elected.

Results

References

1963 elections in Oceania
1963 in Nauru
Elections in Nauru